Baikei Uehira (上平梅径), born Tatsuyoshi Uehira (June 28, 1964) in Izumisano, Japan, 
is a master calligrapher and teacher as well as president of the Seisho Calligraphy Association in Osaka. Originally pursuing calligraphy only for the love of writing, he has gone on to develop new pathways and styles of traditional Japanese calligraphy through collaborations, art shodo, and live performances. Uehira is considered a pioneer of live calligraphy and continues to create innovative works with hopes of expanding interest in Japanese writing to others.

Biography

Early years
At age 6, Uehira began calligraphy classes at school as do most Japanese students. Unlike most children however, he loved calligraphy from day one and continued attending classes through high school. After high school Uehira performed live as a vocalist for the rock band 零夢 (0 Dream). Though music was one of his passions, he decided that he could not support himself with music alone and determined that it was time to begin serious calligraphy study at university. 
	
Shortly thereafter, he took his calligraphy college entrance exam but was rejected both the first and second years that he applied. After more than one year of doing menial jobs Uehira at last was able to enter professional Japanese calligraphy school in Tokyo.
	
While studying Chinese and Japanese calligraphy, Japanese literature, kanji interpretation, etc., Uehira practiced fervently, bundling pages in an old cloth to carry them to and from school. Inspired by Kūkai (空海) he dreamed of creating innovative works to inspire future generations. Though the young Uehira put great effort into his studies, many teachers felt his work was poor. Desperately he approached teacher and mentor Kyoshuu Mochizuki with his work. Master calligrapher Mochizuki carefully reviewed each sheet of Uehira's writing, offering words of advice. The budding artist was moved to tears and was motivated to amplify his efforts.

Due to a somewhat mysterious event at age 22, a scarred Uehira returned to Osaka. Devastated and unmotivated, he began working at a calligraphy supply shop just to stay busy. A calligraphy teacher who was a frequent customer invited Uehira to train with him, which turned out to be a huge blessing. Uehira did so for eight years at the most well-known calligraphy group in Kansai.

Establishment of the Seisho Calligraphy Association 
At age 29, making the most of his training, Uehira established and became president of his own calligraphy association, 青霄 (Seisho), "cloudless blue sky". He has gone on to found schools in Osaka (Namba, Shinsaibashi, and Umeda) and continues to teach, perform, and lecture.

Uehira currently lives with his wife Seikei (also a calligrapher) and three children in the Kansai area. Currently more than 2,000 students study under them.

Career and activity in calligraphy

Awards 
 2007 - Mainichi Calligraphy Exhibition top prize
 2010 - Mainichi Calligraphy Exhibition promoted to ranking member
 2014 - Dokuritsu Calligraphy Exhibition top prize
 2018 - Dokuritsu Calligraphy Exhibition promoted to judge
 2020 - Mainichi Calligraphy Exhibition promoted to judge
 2020 - Became Representative Director at Japanese Culture & Art Association

Calligraphy art 
 1997 - Umeda Sky Building Kuuchuuteien (aerial garden) exhibition; a collaboration project of calligraphy and flower arrangement Shokasanran with teachers from CB International Flower Arrangement College
 1998 - Calligraphy for TV commercial Kiku Masamune, titled「一」one
 2000 - Calligraphy on a large scale Japanese fan for an event at Osaka Kourakuen Hotel
 2000 - Guest appearance for Shoukyokusai Kotenshou's live event at Yoshimoto Enterprise Waha Kamigata
 2000 - Live calligraphy for ‘Kobe requiem’ (lyric writer: Maho Okamoto) on the Kobe Liner passenger ship; the piece was created to be housed at the Hokudanchou Earthquake Memorial Hall on Awaji Island
 2001 - Appearance on Sutekina Furusato Yume Tanbou TV Osaka
 2002 - Hana No Iro Wa Utsurini Kerina live stage calligraphy event at Umeda Daimaru Osaka
 2002 - Yume (dream) live event at Umeda Daimaru Osaka 
 2005 - Exhibition of classic calligraphy works for Osaka City Art Museum
 2006 - Calligraphy used in the opening of ABC's TV show of new comedians titled Owarai Shinjin Grand Prix
 2007 - Appearance for Annta Kakkoeena Sukina Dake Yari and Bou TV commercial 
 2007 - 「響」 (hibiki) writing for the opening title of ‘Artist Special’ on SKY PerfecTV!
 2008 - New Year card workshop sponsored by Japan Post
 2009 - Live writing on shikishi (small drawing boards used for poetry) at Shinsaibashi Dekimonoshou Exhibition in Daimaru 
 2009 - Calligraphy at Mikage Yuzuruha Shrine's Hanabira Festival 
 2010 - Performance at the 1000 guest opening of the Imperial Hotel, Tokyo
 2010 - Performance and exhibition of works at Kyoto Kokusai Kouryuu Kaikann 
 2011 - Live writing at Okura Garden Hotel Shanghai
 2011 - Performance at Granvia Hotel in Kyoto
 2012 - Guest appearance on Ameagari Show Club
 2012 - Performance at Swissôtel for Nikkei public listing celebrations
 2012 - Calligraphy for Geidankyo Kansai Council
 2012 - Ehime Cultural Festival performance in Osaka
 2012 - Appeared on "Yoidon" show, Kansai TV
 2013 - Guest appearance on Hotnet 
 2013 - USA tour to Las Vegas, Phoenix, and Los Angeles (included 2 live performances for the Japan Foundation)
 2013 - Guest appearance on Yomiuri TV "Sumatan ZIP"
 2014 - Performance and workshop at Plaza Club in Honolulu, Hawaii
 2014 - Wrote a 100-foot scroll at First Friday art event in Honolulu, Hawaii
 2014 - Two live shows at Waikiki Marriott Hotel in Honolulu, Hawaii
 2014 - Performance and workshop at Honolulu Museum of Art School in Honolulu, Hawaii
 2014 - Live writing for Nikko Securities ceremony in Tokyo
 2014 - Workshop at Galleria Arte Giappone in Milano, Italy
 2014 - Performance/workshop at Castrocaro Medieval Fortress
 2014 - Performance/workshop at Japan Expo in Paris
 2015 - Presented artwork to world heritage Kudoyama City (Ichiganji Temple)
 2015 - Chamber of Commerce event hosted by Mihana Keiya
 2015 - Calligraphy performances for Ai Matsuri in Java and Sumatra
 2015 - Paper door writing ceremony at Fukichin Temple, Mount Koya
 2015 - Performance for sister city governments of Izumisano and Shanghai
 2015 - Dokuritsu Exhibition in Tokyo, Japan
 2015 - Mainichi Newspaper Exhibition national showing
 2015 - Big brush workshop at the Asia and Pacific Trade Center
 2016 - Performance and workshop for Gyokuzan Kikumoto in Taipei, Taiwan
 2016 - Presented works to Tengard Holdings in Hong Kong
 2016 - Donated works to Jizouji Temple in Wakayama, Japan
 2016 - Performed at G7 Summit in Tsukuba, Japan
 2016 - National Palace Museum in Taipei, Taiwan performance
 2017 - TV appearance on Tatakae! Sports Naikaku
 2017 - Embassy of Japan performance in Prague, CZ
 2017 - Venezia Oriental Museum performance & workshop
 2018 - Galaxy Macau performance & workshop
 2018 - Taiwan performances at Chaotian Temple, Guandu Temple, and Lintianshan Forestry Culture Park
 2019 - Japanese Culture Festival performance in Hanoi, Vietnam
 2019 - Hotel Okura performance & workshop in Amsterdam, NL
 2019 - Centro Studi d’Arte Estremo-Orientale Bologna lecture & workshop
 2019 - Sabadell Design College lecture & workshop
 2019 - APU Malaysia University workshops
 2019 - Reiwa writing at Sumiyoshi Shrine
 2020 - Performance & workshop at Hrvatski kulturni dom na Sušaku in Rijeka, Croatia

Calligraphy collaboration 
 1999 - Live calligraphy with flamenco guitarist Jirou Yoshikawa at WTC Cosmo Tower
 2001 - Appearance at Jazz Show writing: Yume Haruka, Ai Eien, and Kotobuki at Takarazuka Hotel
 2002 - Collaboration with iwabue (traditional stone flute) at Mikage Yuzuruha Shrine in Kobe
 2002 - Collaboration with shamisen, percussion, and dance at Yoshimoto Enterprise Waha Kamigata
 2003 - Joint live event with shakuhachi and sitar at Mikage Yuzuruha Shrine in Kobe
 2003 - Live writing of Fuusetsuenbu with music, and imagery
 2004 - Calligraphy performance for a Seizan Ichikawa shamisen lecture at Suita Mei Theater
 2005 - Guest appearance for a tandem event with acclaimed shamisen artist Kubosan at Taikoen in Kyobashi, Osaka
 2006 - Large calligraphy at Seizan Ichikawa's Kokera Otoshi Concert at Nishinomiya Geijutsu Bunka Hall
 2006 - Performance for a New Year celebration at Westin Hotel Awaji
 2006 - Collaboration with clarinetist Hariyamasan at Kobe Hotel
 2006 - Big brush writing for the program titled Voice, (with Hiroshi Kubo playing tsugaru shamisen) an MBS News special program
 2007 - Performing live for NHK TV show Motto Motto Kansai
 2007 - Teaching with newscaster Yoko Suka of YTV News's New Scramble
 2008 - Performing live for NHK TV show News Terrace
 2008 - Performing live for Kansai TV show News Anchor
 2008 - Appearance on ABC TV show Ohayou
 2008 - Writing in TV commercial for Hankyu Sanbangai
 2009 - Writing New Year cards for a Kansai TV 「美」 (beauty) program
 2009 - Performance collaborating with wadaiko (Japanese drums) at Watashi No Shigotokan in Kyoto
 2009 - Teaching calligraphy to Yuuichi Wazumi of MBS's Eenaa 
 2010 - Collaborating on big brush calligraphy with Naomi Matsushima for TV show Kirakira Afro
 2010 - Hanshinsan writing for a TV commercial at 「 廣斉堂」 studio
 2010 - Calligraphy for TV commercial titled Tiger Tsuchi De Taku
 2011 - Performance with dancer Mihana Keiya and shamisen artist Seizan Ichikawa
 2012 - Art fundraiser for Fukushima victims in Mino, Japan
 2012 - Live with calligrapher Raikei at Suita Mei Theater Main Hall
 2013 - Donated works to Kobe Ginga Club Magazine
 2013 - Live show for Chiayi City Cultural Festival in Taiwan
 2013 - Live collaboration at world heritage Kasuga Taisha Shrine with bushido master Umeda Masami in Nara, Japan
 2013 - Shamisen creative dance collaboration in Bangkok, Thailand
 2013 - Calligraphy collaboration with Lady Gaga on Yomiuri TV's "Sukkiri" show　
 2014 - Body art collaboration and exhibition with Chanel Tanaka in Honolulu, Hawaii
 2014 - Collaboration with tattoo artist Richie Lucero at CoXist Studio Honolulu, Hawaii
 2014 - Live collaboration and exhibition with Persian/Arab calligrapher Arash Shirinbab in Oakland, USA
 2015 - Participated in the 5th International Exhibition of Calligraphy in Moscow
 2015 - Gallery showing with ceramics master Banjoya Takeshi
 2015 - Collaboration with fiddler Hidenori Omori
 2015 - Collaboration with swordsman Umeda Masami at Himuro Shrine
 2015 - Collaboration with shamisen artist Kubo Hiroshi
 2016 - Performed with Umeda Masami, Kubo Hiroshi, Seizan Ichikawa, and Okamoto Maho at Kobe's Kitano Garden
 2017 - Culture collaboration at Mainichi Broadcasting System
 2018 - Stage show ‘Washoi’ at National Bunraku Theater in Osaka, Japan
 2019 - Takakamo Jinja (高鴨神社) event with The Blue Hearts drummer Kajiwara Tetsuya and Okano Hiroki
 2020 - Niutsuhime-jinja (丹生都比売神社) restoration project with painter Tamura Shigeru

References

External links 
 English Homepage 
 Uehira Baikei / Seisho Calligraphy Association [official website -公式サイト]
 Japanese Homepage 
 上平梅径 / 青霄書法会 [official website -公式サイト]

Living people
1964 births
People from Izumisano